Storry may refer to:

 Beth Storry (born 1978), English field hockey goalkeeper
 Raymond Storry, character in EastEnders
 Malcolm Storry (born 1948), British actor
 Richard Storry Deans Deans (1868–1938), British politician
 Storry Walton, Australian academic